Donald Norman Shearman  (6 February 1926–2019) was an Australian Anglican bishop who served as Bishop of Rockhampton from 1963 to 1971 and Bishop of Grafton from 1973 to 1985. In 2004, a church tribunal found Shearman guilty of misconduct for sexually abusing a schoolgirl while serving as a boarding master at an Anglican hostel in Forbes, New South Wales, in the 1950s. On 25 August 2004, Shearman became the first member of the clergy in the Anglican Church of Australia to be removed from holy orders as a result of that finding.

Shearman was educated at Orange High School. After World War II service with the Royal Australian Air Force he studied for the priesthood at St John's Theological College, Morpeth. Ordained in 1950, his first post was a curacy at Dubbo. Later he was warden of St John's Hostel, Forbes, then rector of Coonabarabran. His last post before being ordained to the episcopate was as Archdeacon of Mildura. In 1963 he became Bishop of Rockhampton, (he was consecrated a bishop on 24 February 1964 at St John's Cathedral (Brisbane)) a post he held for eight years. After two years as chairman of the Australian Board of Missions he became Bishop of Grafton in 1973, serving until 1985. He resigned his holy orders in 2003 and was later defrocked. The handling of the case by then Archbishop of Brisbane, Peter Hollingworth, led to Hollingworth's later resignation as Governor-General of Australia in 2003.

Shearman was the subject of a submission to the Royal Commission into Institutional Responses to Child Sexual Abuse. In 2007, Shearman's OBE that he was awarded in 1978 was revoked, following being defrocked for sexual assault.

Shearman died in late 2019.

References

1926 births
2019 deaths
Clergy from Sydney
Clergy removed from office
People educated at Orange High School (New South Wales)
Anglican archdeacons in Australia
Anglican bishops of Rockhampton
Anglican bishops of Grafton
20th-century Anglican bishops in Australia
People stripped of a British Commonwealth honour
People educated at St John's College, Morpeth
People from Orange, New South Wales